In the substance of the formatio reticularis are two small nuclei of gray matter. The one near the dorsal aspect of the hilus of the inferior olivary nucleus is called the Sublingual nucleus (inferior central nucleus, nucleus of Roller.)

References

External links
 NIF Search - Sublingual Nucleus via the Neuroscience Information Framework

Medulla oblongata